Enulius roatanensis, the Roatan long-tailed snake,  is a species of snake of the family Colubridae. The species is found in Honduras.

References

Enulius
Endemic fauna of Honduras
Reptiles of Honduras
Reptiles described in 1999